Love + War is the debut studio album by British singer Kwabs. It was released on 11 September 2015 through Atlantic Records.

Background
In 2013, Kwabs signed to Atlantic Records after his cover versions of "Like a Star" by Corinne Bailey Rae and "The Wilhelm Scream" by James Blake went viral on YouTube. In 2014, Kwabs released his debut EP Wrong or Right and was nominated for 'Best Newcomer' at the MOBOs before being shortlisted for the prestigious BBC Sound of 2015 poll.

Kwabs was also nominated as 'Best R&B / Soul' artist at the MOBOs 2015 and for Best Push at the MTV EMAs 2015.

Singles
"Wrong or Right" was the first single from the album and was released on 3 February 2014.

The second single taken from the album was "Walk", released on 29 September 2014. The song was number one in Germany and went Platinum in Norway, as well as Gold in Germany, Austria and Switzerland.

"Fight for Love" was released as the album’s third single on 28 June 2015.

Following the release of the album, "Cheating on Me" was released on 4 December 2015 as the fourth single.

Critical reception
The album received positive reviews. In a strong review, The Independent rated the album five out of five stars, calling it a "stunning debut". In another review, The Line of Best Fit gave the album a rating of 9.5/10, describing it as "the best pop music in the U.K. right now".

The album also received multiple favourable reviews from the likes of The Guardian, MTV, Sunday Times Culture, Mojo, Attitude, Time Out and The 405.

Track listing

Commercial performance

Charts

References

2015 debut albums
Atlantic Records albums
Warner Music Group albums
Albums produced by TMS (production team)